This is a list of people associated with Peking University in China. Several notable individuals have been associated with Peking University.

Faculty

Officers and administrators

 Cai Yuanpei 蔡元培 – early University Chancellor
Chen Duxiu – Peking University dean, co-founder of Chinese Communist Party, 1st general secretary
Li Dazhao – head librarian, later co-founder of the Chinese Communist Party
 Yan Fu 严复 – early University Chancellor
 Hu Shih - Chancellor (1946-1948)
 Jiang Menglin - president of Peking University

Alumni

Writers

Academics 

Shaodong Guo - nutrition scientist, academic and diabetes researcher.

In politics

In business and media

Among the "top 300 richest in China" 27 graduated from Beida, much higher than any other Chinese university. The second ranking school is Zhejiang University, with 17 alumni on the list.

Other 
Including honorary professors and other associates:

See also
 :Category:Peking University alumni
 :Category:Academic staff of Peking University

References
 Bieg, Lutz. "Literary translations of the classical lyric and drama in the first half of the 20th century: The "case" of Vincenz Hundhausen (1878-1955)." (Archive) In: Alleton, Vivianne and Michael Lackner (editors). De l'un au multiple: traductions du chinois vers les langues européennes Translations from Chinese into European Languages. Éditions de la maison des sciences de l'homme (Les Editions de la MSH, FR), 1999, Paris. p. 62-83. , 9782735107681.

Notes

Peking University